Leessang Company (Korean: 리쌍컴퍼니) was a South Korean hip hop record label and tour promotion company based in Seoul, South Korea. It was founded in 2012 by Gary and Gill.

Former Artists

Recording artists

Soloists
 Gary (2012-2017)
 Gill (2012-2017)
 Miwoo (2012-2017)

Groups
 Leessang (2012-2017)

References

External links
 

Leessang
Record labels established in 2012
Music production companies
South Korean hip hop record labels
Companies based in Seoul
Music companies of South Korea
Defunct record labels of South Korea